Naby is a Guinean given name, as well as an Assyrian surname, and may refer to:

Naby Keïta (1995–) Guinean professional footballer
Naby Laye Keïta (1994–) Guinean professional footballer
Eden Naby (1942–) Iranian-Assyrian historian
Naby Damba (1993–) Bissau-Guinean professional footballer
Naby Diarso (1977–) Guinean professional footballer
Naby Soumah (1985–) Guinean professional footballer
Naby Twimumu (1990–) Luxembourgian footballer
Naby Yattara (1984–) Guinean professional footballer